The large-tailed antshrike (Mackenziaena leachii) is a species of bird in the family Thamnophilidae. It is found in the southern Atlantic Forest.

Its natural habitats are subtropical or tropical moist lowland forest and subtropical or tropical moist montane forest.

References

large-tailed antshrike
large-tailed antshrike
Taxonomy articles created by Polbot